The Burner, Burner II, and Burner IIA rocket stages have been used as upper stages of launch vehicles such as the Thor-Burner and Delta since 1965. The Burner 1 stage was also called the Altair stage and was derived from the fourth stage of the Scout launch vehicle. The Burner 2 stage was powered by a Star 37 solid rocket motor.

In September 1965, Air Force Space Systems Division announced the development of a new, low cost upper stage called Burner II. It was intended as the smallest maneuverable upper stage in the Air Force inventory. In June 1967, the first Thor/Burner II vehicle successfully launched a pair of satellites to orbit. In June 1969, the Space and Missile Systems Organization (SAMSO) began development of the Burner IIA configuration which would offer a tandem motor injection capability and almost twice the capability of Burner II. In June 1971, the last of the Burner II missions was launched from Vandenberg by a Thor/Burner II launch vehicle and carried an SESP-1 space environmental satellite.

In addition to use on Delta family rockets, Burner 2 stages have been used on both Atlas and Titan rockets. Atlas E/F vehicles were configured with a Burner II/IIA stage and launched in 1968 and 1972. The first launch failed with the second delivering a radiation research payload for the Space Test Program (P72-1 Radsat) using Burner IIA.

In the mid-1970s Burner II was also studied for use as an upper stage in combination with the Space Shuttle. NASA managers choose other solutions for missions where upper stages were required.

References 

Rocket stages
 
1967 in spaceflight
1971 in spaceflight